Murphydium is a monotypic genus of East African dwarf spiders containing the single species, Murphydium foliatum. It was first described by R. Jocqué in 1996, and has only been found in Kenya and Somalia.

See also
 List of Linyphiidae species (I–P)

References

Linyphiidae
Monotypic Araneomorphae genera
Spiders of Africa